Lao is a Tai language spoken by 7 million people in Laos and 23 million people in northeast Thailand. After the conclusion of the Franco-Siamese War of 1893, the Lao-speaking world was politically split at the Mekong River, with the left bank eventually becoming modern Laos and the right bank the Isan region of Thailand (formerly known as Siam prior to 1932). Isan refers to the local development of the Lao language in Thailand, as it diverged in isolation from Laos. The Isan language is still referred to as Lao by native speakers.

Isan houses the majority of Lao speakers and the affinity of shared culture with Laos is palpable in the food, architecture, music and language of the region. In its purest spoken form, the Isan language is basically the same as Lao spoken in Laos. Using just tone and some lexical items, there are at least twelve distinct speech varieties of Isan, most of which also continue across the Mekong River into Laos. In fact, the different speech varieties on roughly the same latitude tend to have more affinity with each other, despite the international border, than to speech varieties to the north and south. Only a handful of lexical items and grammatical differences exist that differentiate Isan as a whole, mainly as a result of more than a century of political separation between Isan and Laos, but most of these terms were introduced in the 1980s when Isan was better integrated into Thailand's transportation and communication infrastructure.

Comparison of spelling and orthography

Isan and Lao have drifted away from each other mostly in terms of the written language. The Isan people were forced to abandon their traditional Tai Noi script and have come to use the Thai written language, or Isan written in the Thai script, for communication. In Laos, Tai Noi was modified into the modern Lao script, but several spelling changes in the language during the transition from the Lao monarchy to the communist rule moved Thai spelling and Lao spelling of cognate words further apart. Isan, writes all words with Thai cognates as they exist in Thai, with clusters, special letters only found in obscure Sanskrit words and etymological principles that preserve silent letters and numerous exceptions to Thai pronunciation rules although a small handful of Isan words, with no known or very obscure Thai cognates, are spelled more or less the same as they are in Lao.

Lao spelling in Laos was standardized in the opposite direction. Whilst previously written in a mixture of etymological and phonetical spellings, depending on the audience or author, the language underwent several reforms that moved the language towards a purely phonetical spelling. During the restoration of the king of Luang Phrabang as King of Laos under the last years of French rule in Laos, the government standardized the spelling of the Lao language, with movement towards a phonetical spelling with preservation of a semi-etymological spelling for Pali, Sanskrit and French loan words and the addition of archaic letters for words of Pali and Sanskrit origin concerning Indic culture and Buddhism.

Spelling reforms under the communist rule of Laos in 1975 were more radical, with the complete abolition of semi-etymological spelling in favor of phonetical spelling, with the removal of silent letters, removal of special letters for Indic loan words, all vowels being written out implicitly and even the elimination or replacement of the letter ຣ  (but usually pronounced /l/) in official publications, although older people and many in the Lao diaspora continue to use some of the older spelling conventions. The examples demonstrate the differences between Lao and Isan, using Thai orthography, but also that between archaic and modern Lao, as well as the general pronunciation and spelling practices between Standard Thai and Standard Lao in general.

Silent letters
Numerous loan words from other languages, particularly Sanskrit and Pali, have numerous silent letters, sometimes even syllables, that are not pronounced in either Thai, Isan or Lao. In most cases, one of the final consonants in a word, or elsewhere in more recent loans from European languages, will have a special mark written over it (Thai ◌์ / Lao ◌໌), known in Isan as karan (การันต์) and Lao as karan/kalan (ກາລັນ/archaic ກາຣັນຕ໌ ).

In reforms of the Lao language, these silent letters were removed from official spelling, moving the spelling of numerous loan words from etymological to phonetical. For instance, the homophones pronounced  are all written in modern Lao as ຈັນ CH-A-N, chan, but these were previously distinguished in writing as ຈັນທ໌ CH-A-N-[TH] or ຈັນທຣ໌ CH-A-N-[TH]-[R], 'moon'; ຈັນທ໌ CH-A-N-[TH] or ຈັນທນ໌ CH-A-N-[TH]-[N], 'sandalwood' and ຈັນ CH-A-N, 'cruel.' In Isan, using Thai etymological spelling, the respective spellings are จันทร์ CH-A-N-[TH]-[R], จันทน์ CH-A-N-[TH]-[N] and จัน, CH-A-N, with the latter being a shared Lao-Isan word with no Thai cognate.

Consonant clusters
The oldest texts in the Tai Noi corpus show that the earliest stages of the Lao language had consonant clusters in some native words as well as many loan words from Khmer, Mon, other Austroasiatic languages, Sanskrit and Pali. Although most of these were maintained in Thai pronunciation, these clusters were quickly abandoned, indicating that the Tai dialects that became the Lao language lacked them or that they lost them through separate language development. Unlike the Thai script, Lao preserves a subscript version of /l/ and /r/ ◌ຼ that was commonly used in the ancient Tai Noi script when these clusters were pronounced and written.

Some consonant clusters were maintained in the Lao language for some vocabulary, mostly of Sanskrit and Pali derivation and used in royalty or religious settings, but the most recent spelling reforms in the Lao language removed most of them. The Thai language has preserved all of them, and when Isan is written in Thai, cognates of Thai words are spelled as if they are pronounced in Thai, with consonant clusters that are usually not pronounced in Isan except some religious and technical terms.

Explicit gemination in Lao
As consonants may have one value at the start of a consonant and one at the end, occasionally the same letter will be used to end one syllable and begin the next. This remains common in many loan words from Sanskrit and Pali, and was once the case in Lao orthography, but now the different consonant sounds are written out explicitly and no longer implied from older and confusing rules of spelling. Thai, with its etymological spelling, preserves the implied pronunciation of these geminated consonant groupings.

Lao retention of Tai Noi vowel symbols
Lao uses two vowel symbols inherited from Tai Noi, one of which ◌ໍ or the nikkhahit (ນິກຄະຫິດ ) is used to denote the vowel  in open syllables where that is the final sound in the syllable and the other ◌ົ or mai kon (ໄມ້ກົງ ) which is used to denote the vowel , both of which are sometimes implied in Thai orthography. The latter symbol is also used with some vowels with various meanings. The viram (Archaic ວິຣາມ/ວິລາມ ) was formerly used as a variant of Lao letter ຍ in a word as well as several other uses.

Lao simplification of terminal consonants
Spelling reforms in Laos restricted the final consonants to be spelled ກ, ງ, ດ, ນ, ບ and ມ which correspond to Thai letters ก, ง, ด, น, บ and ม, respectively. As Thai has retained these final consonants according to etymology, this has further moved Lao spelling from Thai and Isan written in Thai in a large number of common words.

Lao vowel reduction
The Lao vowel ໄ◌ຽ was also replaced by ໄ.

Lao explicit vowels
In the abugida systems, open syllables are assumed to have  or  following them. Modern Lao spelling requires that all vowels are written out, altering the spelling of numerous words and furthering the language from Thai. As this can alter the tone of the words, sometimes tone marks or silent  are used to either represent the actual pronunciation of the word or restore it to its original pronunciation.

Lao ligatures

As a legacy of the Tai Noi script, Lao writers can use the special ligature ໜ HN instead or, when typesetting or rendering unavailable, it can be optionally be written ຫນ H-N as well as ໝ HM and modern alternative ຫມ. Both ຫລ H-L and ຫຣ H-R have the same ligature form ຫຼ HL/R. Previous versions of the script also had special ligatures ພຽ PHY (ພ + ຍ ) and ຫຽ HY (ຫ + ຍ ) with the latter replaced by ຫຍ HY  (high class tone). Former ligatures such as SN and ML have disappeared or were split into syllables as consonant clusters were generally lost or replaced. For example, Archaic Lao ສນອງ SN-O-NG and ມຼາບຼີ ML-A-BR-I have become in the modern language ສະໜອງ S-A-N-O-NG sanong , 'message' (derived from Khmer snaang ស្នង ) and ມະລາບີ M-A-L-A-B-I malabi , approximation of endonym of the Mlabri people. Thai orthography preserves writing the consonants together, although in the modern Thai language these consonants are separated by a vowel according to the current pronunciation rules.

These symbols were used to represent loanwords from Sanskrit ऋ , ॠ , ऌ  and ॡ , respectively, but the 2nd and 3rd are rare sounds in Sanskrit; last one doesn't occur in Sanskrit and is only there to match the short-long pairs.

Typographical differences
Traditionally, no punctuation exists in either Thai or Lao orthographies, with spaces used to separate lists, sentences and clauses, but otherwise words are written with no spaces between them. A few symbols include the cancellation mark ◌໌ used to mark letters in loan words that are not pronounced, the repetition symbol ໆ used to indicate words or phrases are to be repeated, an ellipsis-like symbol ຯ used to shorten lengthy phrases, such as royal titles or to indicate that following portions have been removed and the equivalent to the et cetera symbol ຯລຯ. These all have equivalents in the Thai script as ◌์, ๆ, ฯ and ฯลฯ.

Other Thai script symbols, such as ๏, used for marking the beginning of texts, lines or stanzas, ๛ to mark the end of chapters, ฯะ to mark the end of stanzas and ๚ to mark the end of sections. These symbols could be combined to provide meaning. A similar system was in use in Laos but was later abolished. The system is mostly archaic in Thai texts, but is still taught as many old texts feature these symbols.

The Lao script only uses two of the tone marks ◌່ and ◌້, although ◌໊ and ◌໋ may occasionally be used to record idiosyncratic or emotional speech, as aids to capture tones of different dialects or onomatopoeia. In the Thai script, the equivalent tone marks are ◌่, ◌้, ◌๊ and ◌๋, respectively.

In modern writing, Thai and Lao orthographies have both adopted the question mark "?", exclamation point "!", comma "", parentheses "()", hyphen "-", ellipsis "...", and period "." from their respective English and French sources. Since Isan adopted the Thai punctuation via English, the quotation marks """" are used instead of guillemets, "«»", and spaces are not inserted before terminal punctuation marks. Although Lao speakers in Laos will often use French-style punctuation, English-style punctuation is increasingly becoming more commonplace there.

Grammatical differences

Formal language
Since the use of Central Thai is deemed polite and mandatory in official and formal settings, Isan speakers will often use the Thai ครับ, khrap, used by males, and ค่ะ, kha, used by females, sometimes in place of or after the ones shared with Lao. Isan speakers, however, do not use the very formal particle ข้าน้อย, khanoy (cf. Lao: ຂ້ານ້ອຍ/archaic ຂ້ານ້ຽ) at the end of sentences. Also, the use of เจ้า, chao (cf. Lao: ເຈົ້າ) and formal โดย, doy (cf. Lao: ໂດຍ/archaic ໂດຽ, dôy), to mark the affirmative or "yes" is no longer used in Isan, instead this is replaced with the general ending particles or the equivalent Thai expression.

Word order
A very few compounds in Lao are left-branching, but most of the time they are right-branching, as they are almost always in Thai and Isan.
 Isan หมูส้ม mu som (but Lao ສົ້ມໝູ/ສົ້ມຫມູ som mou, "sour pork", (. Cf. Thai หมูแหนม, mu naem.
 Isan ไก่ปิ้ง kai ping, but Lao ປີ້ງໄກ່, ping kai, "barbecued chicken",. Cf. Thai ไก่ย่าง, kai yang.

Lexical comparison
Lao and Isan share most of their vocabulary, tone, and grammatical features. Technical, academic, and scientific language, and different sources for loan words have diverged the speech to an extent. Isan has borrowed most of its vocabulary from Thai, including numerous English and Chinese (Min Nan) loan words that are commonly used in Thai. Lao, on the other hand, has influences from French and Vietnamese that come from the establishment of the Protectorate of Laos and its inclusion in French Indochina. In ordinary and casual speech, only a few lexical items separate Isan and Lao, and many dialects do not end at the border.

Thai loanwords
The main thing that differentiates Isan from Lao is the use of numerous Thai words. The process accelerated with greater integration of Isan into Thai political control in the early 20th century. Thai words make up the bulk of scientific, technical, governmental, political, academic, and slang vocabularies that have been adopted in Isan. Many words used in Isan have become obsolete, such as the use of ขัว, khua and น้ำก้อน, nam kon, which exist in Laos as ຂົວ and ນ້ຳກ້ອນ, but replaced by Thai forms สะพาน, saphan, and น้ำแข็ง, nam khaeng, respectively. Thai, Isan, and Lao share vocabulary, but sometimes this can vary in frequency. For instance, Lao speakers use ສະພານ, saphan, as a more formal word for "bridge". The very formal Thai word for "house", เรือน, reuan is cognate to the common Isan เฮือน, heuan, and Lao ເຮືອນ, huan. Although many Lao speakers can understand and speak Thai due to exposure to Thai publications and media, the official status of the language in Laos, pressure to preserve the Lao language, and unique neologisms and other influences differentiate the language from Thai. A few neologisms in Laos are unique coinages.

French loanwords

After the division of the Lao-speaking world in 1893, French would serve as the administrative language of the French Protectorate of Laos, carved from the Lao lands of the left bank, for sixty years until 1953 when Laos achieved full independence. The close relationship of the Lao monarchy with France continued the promotion and spread of French until the end of the Laotian Civil War when the monarchy was removed and the privileged position of French began its decline. Many of the initial borrowings for terms from Western culture were imported via French, as opposed to Isan which derived them from English via Thai. For instance, Isan speakers use sentimet in approximation of English 'centimeter' whereas Lao uses xangtimèt in approximation of French centimètre. Lao people also tend to use French forms of geographic place names, thus the Republic of Guinea is kini via Thai based on English 'Guinea' as opposed to kiné from French Guinée.

Laos maintains the French-language weekly Le Rénovateur, but French-language content is sometimes seen alongside English in publications in older issues of Khaosane Phathét Lao News and sporadically on television ad radio. French still appears on signage, is the language of major civil engineering projects and is the language of the élite, especially the older generations that received secondary and tertiary education in French-medium schools or studied in France. France maintains a large Lao diaspora and some of the very well-to-do still send their children to France for study. The result of this long-standing French influence is the use of hundreds of loan words of French origin in the Lao language of Laos—although many are old-fashioned and somewhat obsolete or co-exist alongside more predominate native usages—that are unfamiliar to most Isan speakers since the incorporation of the right bank into Siam prevented French influence.

Vietnamese loanwords
As a result of Vietnamese immigration and influence, a handful of lexical items have been borrowed directly from Vietnamese, most of which are not used in Isan, although 'to work' or wiak has spread into Isan from Lao viak from Vietnamese việc. Vietnamese Laotians comprise roughly 79,000 people in Laos today, roughly three times the number of Vietnamese people in Isan, and operate local schools and community associations in the major cities, although many of the Vietnamese Isan people are descendants of Vietnamese that fled Laos during the Laotian Civil War and many of their descendants have assimilated to the local language. The Vietnamese have little cultural impact in Isan, and thus aside from wiak, most Vietnamese terms borrowed in Lao are not used in Isan. The opening of Laos in the 1990s has significantly reduced the presence of the Vietnamese military and technical assistance.

Vocabulary unique to Isan
A small handful of lexical items are unique to Isan and not commonly found in standard Lao, but may exist in other Lao dialects. Some of these words exist alongside more typically Lao or Thai usages.

Other lexical differences

 1 Lao ນ້ຳກ້ອນ formerly existed as Isan น้ำก้อน, nam kon, but usage now obsolete.
 2 Thai and Isan น้ำแข็ง also exists as Lao ນ້ຳແຂງ, nam khèng.
 3 Lao ຂົວ formerly existed as Isan ขัว, khua, but usage now obsolete.
 4 Thai and Isan สะพาน also exists as formal Lao ສະພານ, saphane.
 5 Thai and Isan หน้าต่าง also exists as Lao ຫນ້າຕ່າງ/ໜ້າຕ່າງ, natang.
 6 Thai and Isan กระดาษ also exists as Lao ກະດາດ/Archaic ກະດາສ, kadat.
 7 Thai and Isan หนังสือ also exists as Lao ໜັງສື/ຫນັງສື, nangsue.
 8 Lao ມັງກອນ also exists as Isan มังกร, mangkon, referring to the dragon but not the month named after it.
 9 Thai and Isan มกราคม also exists as Lao ມົກກະລາຄົມ/Archaic ມົກກະຣາຄົມ, môkkarakhôm.
 10 Lao ແຂວງ also exists as Thai and Isan แขวง, khwaeng, when referring to provinces of Laos.
 11 Thai and Isan จังหวัด exist as Lao ຈັງຫວັດ, changvat, when referring to provinces of Thailand.
 12 Thai and Isan variant of มอเตอร์ไซค์, รถจักรยานยนต์, rot chakkrayanyon, similar to Lao ລົດຈັກ[ກະຍານ]/Archaic ຣົຖຈັກຍານ, lôt chak[kagnane].
 13 Isan บัก is a local variant of Isan หมาก and Lao ໝາກ/ຫມາກ, mak.
 14 The มะ in Thai มะละกอ is cognate to Isan หมาก and Lao ໝາກ/ຫມາກ, mak.

See also
Comparison of Lao and Thai

Notes

References

Isan language
Lao language
Language comparison